181st Brigade may refer to:

 181st Brigade with 5th Light Horse Brigade
 181st Mixed Brigade (Spain)
 181st (2/6th London) Brigade (United Kingdom)
 181st Infantry Brigade (United States)